Madhusoodanan Jayachandran is an Indian composer, singer, and musician. He has won the Kerala State Film Award for Best Music Director for a record number of nine times. In 2005, he also won the state award for best male singer. In 2015, he won the National Film Award for Best Music Direction for the film Ennu Ninte Moideen. He has composed music for 126 films.

Biography
Jayachandran was born on June 14, 1971 at Thiruvananthapuram. He began learning Carnatic music at the age of 5 under Attingal Harihara Iyer and later under Perumbavoor G. Raveendranath. Thereafter, he was a student of Neyyattinkara Mohanachandran for 18 years. He won the Carnatic vocal competition at the Kerala University youth festival four times in a row from 1987 to 1990. He completed his graduation in Electrical Engineering from TKM College of Engineering and College of Engineering, Trivandrum.

He began his career in the film industry as a playback singer for the movie Vasudha in 1992, then became an assistant to Malayalam music director G. Devarajan. In 1995, he became an independent music director through the film Chantha.

Personal life

Jayachandran is the younger among the two sons of late Madhusoodanan Nair (d. 2014) and late Vijaya Nair (d. 2009), born on 14 June 1971. He has an elder brother named Prakash Chandran. He worked at Asianet before taking up full-time music direction. He married Priya on 12 November 1995, and has two sons Nandagopal and Karthik Gopal. He has been on the judging panel of musical reality shows in Malayalam television.

Filmography

{|class="wikitable" 
|-
! Year !! Title !! Notes
|-
|2021
|Pathonpatham Noottandu
|Upcoming Movie
|-
|2020
|Sufiyum Sujatayum
|| Kerala State Film Award for Best Music Director 

|-
|rowspan=3|2019 
|Mamangam|
|-
| Thakkol || 
|-
|Pattabhiraman ||
|-
| rowspan="5"| 2018 || Odiyan ||
|-
| Koode ||
|-
| Ente Mezhuthiri Athazhangal ||
|-
|| Aami ||
|-
|| Kinar ||
|-
|rowspan="2"|2017 || Pullikkaran Staraa ||
|-
|Munthirivallikal Thalirkkumbol ||
|-
|rowspan="2"| 2016 || Mohavalayam ||
|-
| Kambhoji ||Kerala State Film Award for Best Music Director 
|-
|rowspan="2"| 2015 || Ennu Ninte Moideen || National Film Award for Best Music Direction  Filmfare Award for Best Music Director – Malayalam
|-
|| Nirnnayakam || Song composer only
|-
|| 2014 || Cousins ||
|-
|rowspan="8"| 2013 || Kadhaveedu ||
|-
|| Radio Jockey ||
|-
|| Pattam Pole ||
|-
|| Kalimannu ||
|-
|| Up & Down - Mukalil Oralundu ||
|-
|| Celluloid || Kerala State Film Award for Best Music Director  Filmfare Award for Best Music Director – Malayalam
|-
|| Kammath & Kammath ||
|-
|| Romans ||
|-
|rowspan="7"| 2012 || Trivandrum Lodge ||
|-
|| Aan Piranna Veedu ||
|-
|| 916 ||
|-
|| No. 66 Madhura Bus ||
|-
| Chattakaari ||
|-
|| Mallu Singh ||
|-
|| Ezham Suryan ||
|-
|rowspan="8"| 2011 ||Swapna Sanchari ||
|-
| Pranayam || Filmfare Award for Best Music Director – Malayalam
|-
| Rathinirvedam || 
|-
| Manikiakkallu || Also guest appearance
|-
| Lucky Jokers ||  Composed along with Berny ignatious and S.P Venkatesh
|-
| Bhakthajanangalude Sradhakku ||
|-
| Living Together ||
|-
|  Khaddama || Background music only
|-
|rowspan="13"| 2010 || Shikkar || 
|-
| Sahasram ||
|-
| Karayilekku Oru Kadal Dooram || Kerala State Film Award for Best Music Director
|-
| Four Friends ||
|-
| Sadgamaya || 
|-
| Arayan ||
|-
| Oru Small Family ||
|-
|Janakan ||
|-
| Kadaksham ||
|-
| April Fool ||
|-
| PSC Balan ||
|-
| Pramani ||
|-
| Happy Husbands ||
|-
|rowspan="16"| 2009 || Robin Hood ||
|-
| Bharya Onnu Makkal Moonnu ||
|-
| Ivar Vivahitharayal ||
|-
| Utharaswayamvaram ||
|-
| Kancheepurathe Kalyanam ||
|-
| Banaras ||
|-
| Orkkuka Vallappozhum ||
|-
| Makante Achan ||
|-
| Chemistry ||
|-
| Vairam ||
|-
| Katha, Samvidhanam: Kunchacko ||
|-
| Nammal Thammil ||
|-
| Samastha Keralam PO ||
|-
| Kaval Nilayam || Tamil
|-
| I G Inspector General || 
|-
| Vilapangalkappuram ||
|-
|rowspan="6"| 2008 || De Ingottu Nokkiye ||
|-
| Sultan ||
|-
| Parthan Kanda Paralokam ||
|-
| Madampi || Kerala State Film Award for Best Music Director
|-
| Anthiponvettam ||
|-
| Novel || Also guest appearance
|-
|rowspan="2"| 2007 || Katha Parayumbol ||
|-
| Nivedyam || Kerala State Film Award for Best Music Director Asianet Film Award for Best Music Director
|-
|rowspan="9"| 2006 || Kanaka Simhasanam ||
|-
| Nottam || Kerala State Film Award For Best Male Playback Singer
|-
| Chakkara Muthu ||
|-
| Mahasamudram ||
|-
| Bus Conductor ||
|-
| Ravanan ||
|-
| Bada Dosth ||
|-
| Madhuchandralekha ||
|-
| Annorikkal || Guest composer
|-
|rowspan="10"| 2005 || Boy Friend ||
|-
| Lokanathan I.A.S ||
|-
| Gomathi Nayagam ||Tamil film
|-
| Paranju Theeratha Visheshangal ||
|-
| Krithyam ||
|-
| Athbhutha Dweepu ||
|-
| Immini Nalloraal ||
|-
| Junior Senior ||
|-
| Sarkar Dada ||
|-
| The Campus ||
|-
|rowspan="16"| 2004 || Amrutham ||
|-
| Perumazhakkalam || Kerala State Film Award for Best Music Director  Asianet Film Award for Best Music Director Asianet Film Award for Best Male Playback Singer Filmfare Award for Best Music Director – Malayalam
|-
| Kathavasheshan || Kerala State Film Award for Best Music Director
|-
| Maampazhakkaalam ||
|-
| Malsaram ||
|-
| Youth Festival ||
|-
| Sathyam ||
|-
| Natturajavu ||
|-
| Mayilattam ||
|-
| Akale ||
|-
| Kanninum Kannadikkum ||
|-
| Vellinakshatram ||
|-
| Kusruthi ||
|-
| Two Wheeler ||
|-
| Kakkakarumban || 
|-
| Thalamelam ||
|-
|rowspan="2"| 2003 || Gaurisankaram || Kerala State Film Award for Best Music Director  Asianet Film Award for Best Music Director
|-
| Balettan ||
|-
|rowspan="5"| 2002 || Kanmashi ||
|-
| Savithriyude Aranjanam ||
|-
| Basket|
|-
| Valkannadi ||
|-
| Pakalppooram || Guest composer
|-
|rowspan="6"| 2001 || Bharthavudyogam ||
|-
| Sathyameva Jayathe ||
|-
| Nagaravadhu ||
|-
| Naranathu Thampuran ||
|-
| Punyam ||
|-
| Samana Thalam ||
|-
| 1996 || Rajaputhran||
|-
| 1995 || Chantha ||
|}

Albums (non-film)

 Mangalyathaali (lyrics: Chovvalloor Krishnankutty, Chittoor Gopi, Sreemoolanagaram Ponnan, singers: various)
 Mahamaaya (2005) (lyrics: Rajeev Alunkal, singer: K. S. Chithra)
 Sandhyanjali (2005) (lyrics: Traditional, singer: K. S. Chithra)
 Unnikkannan (2005) (lyrics: Chowalloor Krishnankutty, singer: K. S. Chithra)
 Vandeham Harikrishna (2006) (lyrics: Gireesh Puthenchery, singer: K. S. Chithra)
 Padmam Sree Padmam (2008) (lyrics: S Ramesan Nair, singers: M. G. Sreekumar, Radhika Thilak)
 Aattukal Deviyamma (lyrics: various, singers: various)
 Amme Devi Mahamaye (lyrics: S. Ramesan Nair, singer: P. Jayachandran)
 Gopichandanam (lyrics: S Ramesan Nair, singer: K. S. Chithra)
 Haripriya (lyrics: S Ramesan Nair, singer: K. S. Chithra)
 Campus (2002) (lyrics: Gireesh Puthenchery, S Ramesan Nair, Rajeev Alunkal, Yogesh, singers: various)
 Kudamullapoo (2003) (lyrics: Gireesh Puthenchery, singers: K. J. Yesudas, Vijay Yesudas, K. S. Chithra)
 Iniyennum (2004) (lyrics: East Coast Vijayan, singers: various)
 Ormakkai (2005) (lyrics: East Coast Vijayan, singers: various)
 Swantham (2006) (lyrics: East Coast Vijayan, singers: various)
 Raagolsavam (lyrics: Pallippuram Mohanachandran, singers: Biju Narayanan, Srinivas, K. S. Chithra)
 Thiruvona Paattu (lyrics: Sreekumaran Thampi, singers: P. Jayachandran, K. S. Chithra)

Television

TV Shows as Judge
Saptaswarangal  (Asianet)
Mega Singer (Jeevan TV)
Voice of Kerala (Surya TV)
Gandharvasangeetham (Kairali TV)
Star Singer  (Asianet)
Old is Gold (Surya TV)
Super Star (Amrita TV)

TV serials as Music Director
Indulekha (Surya TV)
Santhwanam (Asianet)
Padathapainkili (Asianet)Ammayariyathe (Asianet)Kabani (Zee Keralam)Bharathi Kannamaa (Star Vijay) -TamilSwathi Nakshatram Chothi (Zee Keralam)Chembarathi(Zee Keralam)Mouna Ragam (Star Vijay) -TamilVanambadi (Asianet)
Sreekrishnan (Surya TV)Geethanjali (Surya TV)Adhiparashakthi Chottanikkarayamma (Surya TV)Sreeguruvayoorappan (Surya TV)Ente Sooryaputhri (Asianet)Sooryaputhri (Asianet)Innale (Surya TV)Black and White (Asianet)

Awards

National Film Awards:
 2015 – Best Music Director – Ennu Ninte Moideen ("Kathirunnu Kathirunnu")

Honorary
 2012 – Swaralaya Yesudas Award

Kerala State Film Awards:
 2003 – Best Music Director – Gaurisankaram 2004 – Best Music Director – Perumazhakkalam and  Kathavasheshan 2005 – Best Play Back Singer – Nottam ("Melle Melle")
 2007 – Best Music Director – Nivedyam 2008 – Best Music Director – Madampi 2010 – Best Music Director – Karayilekku Oru Kadal Dooram 2012 – Best Music Director – Celluloid 2016 – Best Music Director – Kamboji 2021- Best Music Director- Sufiyum_SujatayumKerala Film Critics Association Awards
 2003 – Best Music Director - Balettan, Gaurisankaram, Kanninum Kannadikkum
Asianet Film Awards:
 2003 – Best Music Director Award Gaurisankaram 2004 – Best Music Director Award Perumazhakkalam, Mampazhakkalam 2007 – Best Music Director Award Nivedyam 2011 – Best Music Director Award PranayamFilmfare Awards South
 2004 – Filmfare Award for Best Music Director – Malayalam – Perumazhakkalam 2011 – Filmfare Award for Best Music Director – Malayalam – Pranayam 2013 – Filmfare Award for Best Music Director – Malayalam – Celluloid 2015 – Filmfare Award for Best Music Director – Malayalam – Ennu Ninte Moideen''

Asiavision Awards
 2013 – Asiavision Awards – Best Music Director
Mirchi Music Awards South
2009 - Best music director
2009 - Album of the year 
2009 - Song of the year
2010 - Best music director
2010 - Album of the year
2010 - Song of the year
2011 - Song of the year
2011 - Album of the year
2011 - Best music director
Asianet Television Awards
2017 - Manninte Manamulla Sangeetham ( Honorary awards)
2017 - Best Music Director
Vijay Television Awards
2018 - Vijay Television Awards for Special Jury Award
Mazhavil Mango Award
2021 - Best Music director

References

External links

Scaling peaks of success

Malayalam playback singers
Malayalam film score composers
Musicians from Thiruvananthapuram
Kerala State Film Award winners
Filmfare Awards South winners
1971 births
Living people
Film musicians from Kerala
21st-century Indian composers
Best Music Direction National Film Award winners